Kaht (also Romanized as Kahat; also known as Kabat) is a village in Khabar Rural District, in the Central District of Baft County, Kerman Province, Iran. At the 2006 census, its population was 44, in 14 families.

References 

Populated places in Baft County